Pedro Cernadas (born March 20, 1972, in Viedma, Río Negro, Argentina), better known as Segundo Cernadas, is an Argentine actor who has gained international fame in South America and other parts of the world. Cernadas is considered a teen idol in Argentina; especially well followed among teenage girls.

He discovered his passion for acting during his teenage years.

He was influenced by a show business insider to change his screen name to "Segundo", the name of his favorite fictional character, the protagonist and an actor in Don Segundo Sombra.

Pablo Ponce, a well known Argentine acting instructor, was Cernadas' first professional acting teacher. Soon after, Cernadas was accepted by one of Argentina's top show business academies.

Although Cernadas' main acting interests were in the theatrical area, soon after being accepted by the academy, he made his television debut, acting in Montana Rusa, Otra Vuelta ("Rollercoaster, (let's go) One More Time"). He followed that by participating, as a married medical doctor in 90-60-90 Modelos.

In 1997, Cernadas made his third appearance in a telenovela, in Ricos y Famosos ("Rich and Famous"), which became a major international hit.

1998 was an important year in Cernadas' life: after participating in Milady: La Historia Continua ("Milady: The Story Continues)", which was the sequel to Argentine soap opera classic Milady, while considering moving to Mexico to work there, he was convinced to stay in his home country by producer Raúl Lecouna, who offered Cernadas his first starring role as a telenovela actor, in another soap that would become a major hit: Muñeca Brava ("Wild Angel"). This soap opera was successful  and that Cernadas travelled across Argentina, and many other countries, to relive his character at various acting venues for the next two years.

In 2000, he played the role of "Bebo" in Los Buscas de Siempre ("The (same) Bullies of Always)". Later on that year, he would once again play a doctor, in Los Medicos de Hoy ("Today's Doctors").

Cernadas visited Mexico once again, Miami and Caracas, in an effort to find a job. He was hired by Venezuela-based Iguana Productions to star in Todo Sobre Camila ("All About Camila"). He travelled to Ecuador during the filming of this telenovela, as the show was co-produced by Iguana Productions, and an Ecuatorian company.

Cernadas would not become a major international super-star until 2002, when he flew to Peru to act in Bésame Tonto ("Kiss me, Fool"), alongside Gianella Neyra. The soap opera, which featured romantic, family and mafia twists, became the number one show in many countries, such as the Dominican Republic, Chile, and Panama.  This soap opera marked the beginning of a period in which Cernadas began to be recognized as a teen idol by girls and young women outside Argentina as well. 

In 2003, he participated in Dr. Amor ("Dr. Love") .

By 2004, Univision began to show Bésame Tonto in the United States; and  Cernadas became the first Argentine actor to star in a Philippine telenovela, when he went to Manila to participate and team-up with Iza Calzado in Te Amo, Maging Sino Ka Man ("I Love You, Whoever You Are").

In 2005 he returned to Argentina and worked at Amor en custodia (2005) and Se dice amor (2006).

Filmography

Telenovelas

Television series
(2005) "Quien es el jefe?"(2003) "Dr. Amor"...Dr. Fernando Diaz Amor

Personal life
Segundo Cernadas married the Peruvian actress Gianella Neyra in 2004, they had a son named Salvador who was born in 2008. They divorced in 2011.

In 2012, he started a relationship with the lawyer Sofía Bravo who he married in 2018 after 6 years. The couple have two daughters, Isabel who was born on December 27, 2019, and Jacinta born April 19, 2021.

References

External links

 
http://segundocernadas.blogspot.com/ (Fan Site)

1972 births
Living people
People from Viedma
Argentine male actors
Argentine male telenovela actors
Argentine people of Spanish descent